Marnie Blewitt is head of a division at WEHI, which focuses on X-inactivation, and is engaged in research on the role of polycomb-group proteins in hematopoietic stem cell function.

Scientific career

Education

She completed undergraduate studies in 1999 at The University of Sydney, with honours and a double major of Molecular Biology and Genetics. As part of her doctoral research at the same institution under the supervision of Associate Professor Emma Whitelaw, she designed a sensitised mutagenesis screen to find new epigenetic modifiers in mice, for which she was awarded the Genetics Society of Australia DG Catcheside prize for the best PhD in genetics. She moved to Melbourne at the end of 2005 to accept a Peter Doherty post-doctoral fellowship in Doug Hilton's lab from 2005 to 2009, before becoming laboratory head in January 2010.

Research interests

Blewitt's lab focuses on molecular mechanisms behind epigenetic control of gene expression. Her lab has worked on one of the mouse mutants identified in the mutagenesis screen, identifying a critical role for the protein Smchd1 in X inactivation in cancer. Other research activities include the study of the roles of polycomb-group proteins in hematopoietic stem cell function.

Teaching and public service

Marnie Blewitt conducted a massive open online course in epigenetics at Coursera starting on 28 April 2014.

Awards and honors

 Genetics Society of Australia D.G. Catcheside Prize (2006)
 National Health and Medical Research Council Fellowship (2006)
 L'Oréal-UNESCO Awards for Women in Science (2009) 
 National Health and Medical Research Council Grants (2008, 2011, 2012, 2013)
 Australian Academy of Science Ruth Stephens Gani Medal (2009)

Personal life 

Blewitt is married and has two children.

Selected publications

 Blewitt ME, Gendrel A-V, Pang Z, Sparrow DB, Whitelaw N, Craig J, Apedaile A, Hilton DJ, Dunwoodie SL, Brockdorff N, Kay GK and Whitelaw E (2008) SmcHD1, a protein containing a structural maintenance of chromosomes hinge domain, has a critical role in X inactivation. Nat Genet May; 40(5):663-9. 
 Majewski IJ, Blewitt M, deGraaf C, McManus E, Bahlo M, Hyland C, Smyth GK, Corbin J, Metcalf D, Alexander WS, and Hilton DJ (2008) Polycomb repressive complex 2 (PRC2) restricts hematopoietic stem cell identity. PLoS Biology 15 Apr; 6(4):e93. 
 Blewitt ME, Vickaryous NK, Hemley SJ, Ashe A, Bruxner TJ, Preis JI, Arkell R and Whitelaw E (2005) An ENU screen for genes involved in variegation in the mouse. Proc Natl Acad Sci U S A 102(21): 7629–7634. 
 Ashe A, Morgan DK, Whitelaw NC, Bruxner TJ, Vickaryous NK, Cox LL, Butterfield NC, Wicking C, Blewitt ME, Wilkins S, Anderson G, Cox TX and Whitelaw E. (2008) A genome-wide screen for modifiers of transgene variegation identifies genes with critical roles in development. Genome Biol Vol 9 (12) R182 
 Chong S, Vickaryous N, Ashe A, Zamudio N, Youngson N, Hemley S, Stopka T, Skoultchi A, Matthews J, Scott H, de Kretser D, O’Bryan M, Blewitt M and Whitelaw E (2007) Modifiers of epigenetic reprogramming show paternal effects in the mouse. Nat Genet 2007 May;39(5):614-22. Epub 2007 Apr 22. 
 Blewitt ME, Vickaryous NK, Paldi A Koseki H and Whitelaw E (2006) Dynamic reprogramming of DNA methylation at an epigenetically sensitive allele in mice. PLoS Genetics April 2(4) e49. 
 Rakyan VK, Chong S, Champ ME, Cuthbert PC, Morgan HD, Luu KVK and Whitelaw E (2003) Transgenerational inheritance of epigenetic states at the murine AxinFu allele occurs following maternal and paternal transmission. Proc Natl Acad Sci U S A 100(5): 2538–43

References

External links

 Marnie Blewitt Faculty page, Walter and Eliza Hall Institute

Living people
Australian geneticists
University of Sydney alumni
Academic staff of the University of Melbourne
University of Melbourne women
Australian medical researchers
Australian molecular biologists
WEHI alumni
Women molecular biologists
Australian women scientists
Year of birth missing (living people)
WEHI staff